Claisen may refer to:

Rainer Ludwig Claisen, a  German chemist
Claisen rearrangement,  a reaction of a allyl vinyl ether to a γ,δ-unsaturated carbonyl
Claisen condensation, a reaction between esters and carbonyl compounds in the presence of a strong base
Ireland–Claisen rearrangement, a chemical reaction of an allylic ester with strong base
Claisen isatin synthesis

See also 
 5243 Clasien, a minor planet